This article is about the legends surrounding Myrtles Plantation in Louisiana.

Legends and ghost stories
Touted as "One of America's Most Haunted Homes", the plantation is supposedly home to at least 12 ghosts. It is often reported that 10 murders occurred in the house, but historical records only indicate the murder of William Winter. In 2001, Unsolved Mysteries filmed a segment about the alleged hauntings at the plantation. According to host Robert Stack, the production crew experienced technical difficulties during the production of the segment. The Myrtles was also featured on a 2005 episode of Ghost Hunters.

The legend of Chloe
Possibly the most well known of the Myrtles' supposed ghosts, Chloe (or Cloe) was reportedly a slave owned by Clark and Sara Woodruff. According to one story, Clark Woodruff had pressured or forced Chloe into being his mistress. Other versions of the legend have Chloe listening in at keyholes to learn news of Clark Woodruff's business dealings or for other purposes. After being caught, either by Clark or Sara Woodruff, one of her ears was cut off, and she wore a green turban to hide it.

Chloe supposedly baked a cake for one of the two daughters containing extract of boiled and reduced oleander leaves, which are extremely poisonous. The reason she did what she did was to get work back inside the house. A maid who was getting the favor of the mistress was a suspect, with some saying she was getting revenge on the Woodruffs and some saying she was attempting to redeem her position by curing the family of the poisoning. According to the legends, her plan backfired. Only Sara and her two daughters ate the cake, and all died from the poison. Chloe was then supposedly hanged by the other slaves, and thrown into the Mississippi River, either as punishment or to escape punishment by Clark Woodruff for harboring her.

The historical record does not support this legend. There is no record of the Woodruffs owning a slave named Chloe or Cloe, or any slaves. The legends usually claim that Sara and her two daughters were poisoned, but Mary Octavia survived well into adulthood. Finally, Sara, James, and Cornelia Woodruff were not killed by poisoning, but instead succumbed to yellow fever. Regardless of the factual inaccuracy of the Chloe story, some believe a woman wearing a green turban haunts the plantation.

Other legends

There are a variety of other legends surrounding the Myrtles. The house is reputedly built over an Indian burial ground, and the ghost of a young Native American woman has been reported. During the Civil War, the house was ransacked by Union soldiers, and legend claims that three were killed in the house. Supposedly, there is a blood stain in a doorway, roughly the size of a human body, that will not (or would not) come clean. Other legends say that cleaners have been unable to push their mop or broom into that space.

A mirror located in the house supposedly holds the spirits of Sara Woodruff and two of her children. According to custom, mirrors are covered after a death, but legend says that after the poisoning of the Woodruffs, this particular mirror was overlooked. The uncovered mirror reportedly trapped the spirits of Sara and her children, who are occasionally seen or leave handprints in the mirror.

The plantation is also reportedly haunted by a young girl who died in 1868, despite being treated by a local voodoo practitioner. She supposedly appears in the room in which she died, and has been reported to practice voodoo on people sleeping in the room.

There is also a ghost who reportedly walks, staggers, or crawls up the stairs and stops on the 17th step. Some have said that this is William Drew Winter, the victim of the only verified murder in the house. He was shot on the front porch of the main house and, according to legend, staggered or crawled up the stairs, but collapsed, dead, on the 17th step. Alternate versions of his murder claim he managed to crawl up the stairs, and collapsed in his wife's arms on the 17th step. However, this version of the story is contested.

References

Myrtle's plantation